Someone New may refer to:

 "Someone New" (Eskobar song)
 "Someone New" (Hozier song)
 "Someone New", a song by Banks from Goddess